The Edinburgh Airport Rail Link (EARL) was a proposed rail link to Edinburgh Airport, Scotland. The project was passed by the Scottish Parliament in 2007, but following a change of government, was cancelled in September 2007 on the grounds of cost.

The link was planned to open in 2011 and would have included an underground airport station located beneath the terminal building. A tunnel was to have been constructed to take trains underneath the main runway. The Edinburgh Airport Rail Link would have allowed direct rail travel to and from the airport from Scotland's main towns and cities. New rolling stock was to be ordered for the service to compensate for any extra journey time created by the additional stop.

Background
Although Edinburgh Airport has no railway station, it lies in close proximity to two major railway lines, the Fife Circle and the Edinburgh-Glasgow railway lines. The EARL project aimed to construct connecting links from these lines, intersecting at a new underground railway station underneath Edinburgh Airport, in order to provide direct rail links to the airport from Edinburgh, Glasgow and other Scottish cities.

The project was proposed by the Labour and Liberal Democrat coalition of the Scottish Government and it was also supported by the Scottish Conservatives. The Scottish National Party (SNP) and the Scottish Green Party both opposed the project on grounds of cost and because it duplicated existing bus services.

The Edinburgh Airport Rail Link Bill was passed in March 2007 by a vote in the Scottish Parliament of 86 votes to 29. It received Royal Assent on 19 April 2007.

Proposed services
Though the exact timetable had not been finalised, the following service pattern was expected to have been implemented:

Edinburgh-Glasgow - 2 trains per hour
Edinburgh-Dunblane - 2 trains per hour
Fife Circle - 2 trains per hour
Edinburgh-Aberdeen - 1 train per hour
Edinburgh-Perth & Inverness - 1 train per hour

Cancellation
Following the Scottish Parliament election, 2007, the newly elected SNP minority government announced their intention to cancel the Edinburgh Airport Rail Link project in September 2007 amid concerns over the need for public spending cuts. Transport commentators criticised the cancellation of the EARL project, claiming that approximately £30 million had been spent on the scheme.

Following a vote in the Scottish Parliament on 27 June 2007, the Scottish Government agreed to retain the Edinburgh Trams project to construct a light rail line between the airport and Edinburgh city centre.  John Swinney MSP, the Cabinet Secretary for Finance in the Scottish Government, warned that the full underground EARL project would probably be scrapped in favour of the electrification of the Glasgow-Edinburgh Main Line. The Edinburgh Trams service was launched, on 31 May 2014, as a single light rail route from central Edinburgh to the airport.

To address the loss of direct mainline rail links from around Scotland to Edinburgh Airport, the Scottish Government instead proposed a cheaper alternative in the form of a new interchange station at Gogar offering interchange between the Fife Circle Line and the Edinburgh to Aberdeen Line and Edinburgh Trams. Construction of the new station, called Edinburgh Gateway started in April 2015 and it was opened in December 2016.

See also
Transport in Edinburgh
Edinburgh Trams
Edinburgh Airport
Glasgow Airport Rail Link

References

External links

Abandoned rail transport projects in the United Kingdom
Airport rail links in the United Kingdom
Rail Link
Cancelled airport rail links